Ricardo Marzuca is a Palestinian-Chilean who works as a political commentator and teacher at the Universidad de Chile.

Career
His primary work has been in the department for Palestinian culture and Center for Arab Studies where his position has been important due to Chile hosting the largest Palestinian community outside the Middle East. His view on Palestinian statehood was that an appoint for Palestine be made to the UN which "may appeal to international courts in The Hague as their differences and to obtain greater involvement with voice but no vote within the body." On other issues he has promoted reconciliation between ElBeradei and the Muslim Brotherhood during the 2013 Egyptian riots and spoken against Islamophobia.

See also
Marwan Barghouti

References

External links
Official website

Palestinian educational theorists
Palestinian educators
Palestinian social commentators